Raskin (and the feminine variant Raskina) is a surname of Yiddish origin, a matronymic from "Raske", nickname for Rachel.
Notable people with this name include:

In arts and entertainment
Allison Raskin (born 1989), American writer and content creator
Ellen Raskin (1928–1984), American author (The Westing Game), illustrator, and designer
Eugene Raskin or Gene Raskin (c.1910–2004), American musician and playwright
Fred Raskin (born 1972), American film editor
Jenny Raskin (born 1969), American television producer and filmmaker
Jessica Raskin (born 1982), American actress
Jozef Raskin (1892–1943), Belgian painter and missionary
Judith Raskin (1928–1984), American soprano
Lisi Raskin (born 1974), American artist
Mario Raskin (born 1952), Argentine harpsichordist
Maurice Raskin (1906–1984), Belgian violinist
Milt Raskin (1916–1977), American pianist
Philip Raskin (born 1947), Scottish landscape painter
Philip Max Raskin (1880–1944), Jewish/English/American poet
Saul Raskin (1878–1966), American artist and writer

In government and politics
Eleanor Raskin (born 1946), leftist radical, member of the Weather Underground
Jamie Raskin (born 1962), American politician
Marcus Raskin (1934–2017), American progressive activist and social critic
Max Raskin (1902–1984), American politician and judge
Sarah Bloom Raskin (born 1961), American jurist
Wouter Raskin (born 1972), Belgian-Flemish politician

In religion
Aaron Raskin, Chabad rabbi in Brooklyn, New York
Arie Zeev Raskin (born 1976), Chief Rabbi of Cyprus
Dovid Raskin (1927–2011), Chabad Hasidic rabbi

In sport
Guillaume Raskin (1937–2016), Belgian footballer
Nicolas Raskin (born 2001), Belgian footballer
Tubby Raskin (1902–1981), American basketball player and coach
Yulia Raskina (born 1982), Belarusian rhythmic gymnast

In other fields
A. H. Raskin (1911–1993), Canadian-American labor reporter
Aza Raskin (born 1984), son of Jef Raskin and president of Humanized, makers of Enso
Jef Raskin (1943–2005), interface designer for the Apple Macintosh
Jonah Raskin (born 1942), American writer
Lutgarde Raskin, Belgian-American scientist
Paul Raskin (born 1942), future scenario analysis and sustainability expert
Robin Raskin (born 1954), American writer
Victor Raskin (born 1944), Russian-born American linguist

See also
Rashkin (surname)

Yiddish-language surnames
Matronymic surnames